Starcevo may refer to:
Starčevo, a town in Serbia
Starchevo a village in Bulgaria
Starčevo culture, a neolithic culture of Europe

See also
Startsevo (disambiguation)